Giulio Cappellini is the founder and art director of the eponymous Italian furniture company Cappellini based in Milan. In 2004 the Company became part of the Poltrona Frau Group. In 2021, it was acquired by the American office furnisher Haworth Inc.

The company's collections are "known for tapping new trends and far-flung talents" and have included sofas, kitchen sinks, shelving and light fixtures "displayed in an industrial hangar far from the gold-plated shopping district along the Via Monte Napoleone." Described as a "tutti-frutti affair, with minimalism offered up alongside pop fashion, computer tech and amoebic forms", Cappellini's collections have included works by Jasper Morrison, Tom Dixon, Marc Newson, Marcel Wanders, Erwan & Ronan Bouroullec, Nendo, Michael Young, Satyendra Pakhale, Inga Sempé, Alessandro Mendini, Ora Ito, and Dror Benshetrit.

In 2022 he was awarded the Compasso d'Oro Career Award by the ADI Design Museum in Milan.

Publications

References

External links
Official site
Designers
Antonello Mosca Fantasia al potere nella casa di Giulio Cappellini July 24, 2005 Il Giornale

Italian furniture designers
Year of birth missing (living people)
Living people
Giulio Cappellini
Compasso d'Oro Award recipients